Qiao Jie (born January 2, 1964) is a Chinese obstetrician, reproductive physician and biologist. She is an academician of the Chinese Academy of Engineering (CAE) and currently president of Peking University Third Hospital. She is also director of the National Clinical Research Center on Obstetrics & Gynecology, president of China Women Doctors' Association and chair for the Reproductive Medical Society of Chinese Medical Doctor Association.

Biography
Qiao was born in Harbin, Heilongjiang, on January 2, 1964. She holds a bachelor's degree in medical science from Peking University Health Science Center, and master's and doctor's degrees from the Peking University Third Hospital, all in obstetrics and gynaecology. After she got her master's degree, she worked as an obstetrician at the hospital. She carried out postdoctoral research at the Stanford University Medical Center in September 2002. She served two briefly separate terms as a visiting scholar at the Queen Mary Hospital from September 1996 to March 1997 and from October 1997 to November 1997. In October 1997 she was promoted to associate professor of Peking University Third Hospital, and was promoted to full professor in June 2001. Beginning in October 2000, she served in several administrative positions at the hospital, including director of Obstetrics and Gynecology, director of Reproductive Medicine Center, and deputy party chief of the hospital. She has been president of the hospital since May 2012.

On 1 February 2020, Qiao left for Wuhan with a team of medical workers from Beijing to help combat the Wuhan coronavirus epidemic.

Works

Translations

Honours and awards
 2008 National Science Fund for Distinguished Young Scholars
 2009 State Science and Technology Progress Award (Second Class) 
 2010 "Chang Jiang Scholar" (or " Yangtze River Scholar") 
 2011 State Science and Technology Progress Award (Second Class) 
 2011 Science and Technology Progress Award of the Ho Leung Ho Lee Foundation
 2017 State Science and Technology Progress Award (Second Class) 
 November 2017 Academician of the Chinese Academy of Engineering (CAE)
 2018 the 10th Tan Jiazhen Life Science Award

References

External links
Qiao Jie on the Peking University Third Hospital 

1964 births
Living people
People from Harbin
Engineers from Heilongjiang
Physicians from Heilongjiang
Peking University alumni
Academic staff of Peking University
Chinese obstetricians
Biologists from Heilongjiang
Members of the Chinese Academy of Engineering
English–Chinese translators
Educators from Heilongjiang
Members of the 14th Chinese People's Political Consultative Conference